William Alexander (18 September 1880 – 18 October 1917) was a Canadian soldier who served with the 10th Battalion, CEF in France during the First World War. His execution by firing squad following a charge of desertion sparked controversy in Canada. He was one of 25 Canadian soldiers executed during the course of the First World War.

History

Early life
William Alexander was born in London, United Kingdom on 18 October 1880, but the early life of Alexander is very obscure. He served for 8 years in the King's Royal Rifle Corps before emigrating to Canada.

References 

Biography at the Dictionary of Canadian Biography Online

1880 births
1917 deaths
Canadian Expeditionary Force personnel executed during World War I
Alexander, William
King's Royal Rifle Corps soldiers
Canadian Expeditionary Force soldiers
Deserters
Deaths by firearm in France
Military personnel from London
People executed by Canada by firing squad
Canadian military personnel of World War I
Canadian Army soldiers